The 1839 election of the Speaker of the House of Commons occurred on 27 May 1839. James Abercromby had retired due to failing health. The next day he was raised to the peerage as Baron Dunfermline. 

Charles Shaw-Lefevre was proposed by Henry Handley and seconded by Stephen Lushington.

Henry Goulburn was proposed by Sir Watkin Williams-Wynn and seconded by John Wilson-Patten.

Both candidates addressed the House.

On the motion that Shaw-Lefevre take the Chair, he was elected by 317 votes to 299, a majority of 18.

References

 

1839